Nizhneye Mambetshino (Tübänge Mämbätşa) is a rural locality (a village) in Yanybayevsky Selsoviet, Zianchurinsky District, Bashkortostan, Russia. The population was 75 as of 2010. There are 2 streets.

Geography 
Nizhneye Mambetshino is located 148 km southeast of Isyangulovo (the district's administrative centre) by road. Kyzylyarovo is the nearest rural locality.

References 

Rural localities in Zianchurinsky District